Silke Schwager (née Braun, born 8 April 1969 in Oberwiesenthal, East Germany) is a Swiss cross-country skier who competed from 1987 to 1994. She competed for East Germany until 1990, and for Switzerland from 1992. Competing at the 1994 Winter Olympics in Lillehammer, she earned her best career finish of fifth in the 4 × 5 km relay and had her best individual finish of 33rd in the 30 km event.

Schwager finished 38th in the 15 km event at the 1993 FIS Nordic World Ski Championships in Falun. Her best World Cup finish was 25th in a 5 km event in Norway in 1993.

Schwager's best individual career finish was 13th in a 5 km FIS race in Norway in 1992.

Cross-country skiing results
All results are sourced from the International Ski Federation (FIS).

Olympic Games

World Championships

World Cup

Season standings

References

External links

Women's 4 x 5 km cross-country relay Olympic results: 1976-2002 

1969 births
Cross-country skiers at the 1988 Winter Olympics
Cross-country skiers at the 1992 Winter Olympics
Cross-country skiers at the 1994 Winter Olympics
Living people
Swiss female cross-country skiers
German female cross-country skiers
Olympic cross-country skiers of Switzerland
Olympic cross-country skiers of East Germany